Pivotal (19 January 1993 – 19 November 2021) was a British Thoroughbred racehorse and sire. In a racing career restricted to six races between October 1995 and August 1996 he established himself as one of the leading sprinters in Europe. His most important wins came in the King's Stand Stakes and the Nunthorpe Stakes as a three-year-old in the summer of 1996. He was then retired to stud where he became an exceptionally successful breeding stallion.

Background
Pivotal was a chestnut horse bred and owned by the Cheveley Park Stud. He was the first foal sired by Polar Falcon, an American-bred horse who won the Lockinge Stakes and the Haydock Sprint Cup in England in 1991. The stud's foaling record described him as "a strong, well-made colt of good bone and substance. He is possibly a little light in colour, but he has a good head and plenty of quality". The colt was sent into training with Sir Mark Prescott at the Heath House stable in Newmarket. He was ridden in all but the first of his races by the British jockey George Duffield.

Racing career

1995: two-year-old season
Pivotal did not appear on the racecourse until the late autumn of 1995. At Newbury Racecourse on 19 October he started a 16/1 outsider for a six furlong maiden race and finished ninth of the twenty runners behind the Barry Hills-trained Fly Tip. Eleven days later, Pivotal recorded his first success in a six furlong maiden race at Newcastle Racecourse. Ridden for the first time by George Duffield he took the lead inside the final furlong and won by two and a half lengths from Domak Amaam. In November, Pivotal was brought back in distance for a five furlong race at Folkestone Racecourse. He took the lead approaching the final furlong and accelerated clear of the field to win by four lengths in "impressive" style.

1996: three-year-old season
Pivotal did not appear as a three-year-old until June when he was sent to Royal Ascot to contest the all-aged King's Stand Stakes over five furlongs. He started at odds of 13/2 in a seventeen-runner field which included Royal Applause and Hever Golf Rose. Duffield positioned the colt among the leaders from the start before producing a strong late run to take the lead in the last strides to win by half a length from Mind Games. On his next appearance, Pivotal started favourite for the July Cup over six furlongs at Newmarket Racecourse but finished sixth of the ten runners behind Anabaa. At York on 22 August, Pivotal was brought back to five furlongs for the Nunthorpe Stakes. He started poorly and was "pushed along" by Duffield in the early stages but finished strongly to catch the front-running Eveningperformance in the last stride and won by a short head.

Stud record
Pivotal was retired to stand at his owners' Cheveley Park Stud at Newmarket. He has proved to be an "excellent" breeding stallion, siring winners of major races over a wide range of distances. He was retired from stud duties in February 2021.Died on 19 November 2021.

Major winners
c = colt, f = filly, g = gelding

Pedigree

References

1993 racehorse births
2021 racehorse deaths
Racehorses bred in the United Kingdom
Racehorses trained in the United Kingdom
Thoroughbred family 7
Chefs-de-Race